Shenyangbeizhan is a station on Line 2 of the Shenyang Metro. It is adjacent to Shenyang North railway station. The station opened on 30 December 2011.

Station Layout

References 

Railway stations in China opened in 2011
Shenyang Metro stations